Abubakar Ibn Umar Garba Al Amin El-Kanemi Shehu Of Borno (born 13 May 1957) is the Shehu, or traditional ruler, of the Borno Emirate in northeast Nigeria.

Career
Shehu Abubakar Ibn Umar Garbai El-Kanemi (son of Shehu Umar Ibn Abubakar Garbai of Borno) has been the Shehu of Borno since 2009. He was born in Damagum, Yobe State on 13 May 1957. He attended Government College Maiduguri for his secondary education, and in 1975 was admitted to the Staff Training Centre, Potiskum where he obtained the Intermediate Local Government Certificate. He joined the Borno State Government in 1976. Subsequently, he attended Kaduna Polytechnic (1978–1982) and Ahmadu Bello University, Zaria (1986) where he obtained an Advanced Diploma in Local Government Administration. He became Permanent Secretary in the Ministries of Finance (1993), Works and Housing and Local Government and Chieftaincy Affairs (2008).
El-Kanemi is married with three wives and has 15 children.

Reign
Borno State Governor, Ali Modu Sheriff officially appointed him Shehu on 2 March 2009. Two days later, on 4 March 2009, he received the Kanuri investiture (bayatu in Kanuri language).
After his accession, The Yoruba community pledged to fully support El-Kanemi to ensure the peaceful co-existence of the different ethnic and religious groups in Borno State.
In his first public speech after being appointed, El-Kanemi criticized the government for failing to tackle poverty, while urging the people of Borno to desist from begging as a lifestyle and to seek gainful employment.

Footnotes

Bibliography
 Short biography of Shehu Abubakar

Dynasty

External links
Kanuri Studies Association

Royalty of Borno
1957 births
Living people
Kaduna Polytechnic alumni
Ahmadu Bello University alumni